The Dent du Chamois (1,839 m) is a mountain of the Swiss Prealps, located east of Gruyères in the canton of Fribourg. It lies on the range north of the Vanil Noir, between the valleys of the Sarine and the Motélon.

From the col of La Forcla (1,546 m), a trail leads to its summit.

References

External links
 Dent du Chamois on Hikr

Mountains of Switzerland
Mountains of the Alps
Mountains of the canton of Fribourg